This is a list of notable people of Uzbek ethnicity, regardless of their countries.

Business

 Salim Abduvaliev, businessman
 Sherkhan Farnood, Afghan banker and businessman from an Uzbek ethnicity and also founder of Kabul Bank
 Zemarai Kamgar, founder and CEO of Kam Air
 Alisher Usmanov, businessman, oligarch, former president of the FIE

Entertainment

 Lola Astanova, Uzbek-American pianist
 Ari Babakhanov, musician
 Yefim Bronfman, Uzbek-born Israeli-American pianist
 Elena Kats-Chernin, Uzbek-born Australian pianist and composer
 Ilyas Malayev, musician and poet
 Gavriel Mullokandov, singer
 Milana Vayntrub, Uzbek-American actor, writer and comedian
 Rita Volk (Margarita Volkovinskaya), Uzbek-American actress
 Suleiman Yudakov, composer
 Lola Zunnunova, journalist and presenter
 Lucy Dacus, adopted American singer-songwriter (Uzbek birth father)

Literature

 Sylvia Nasar, American writer, economist and journalist
 Hamza Hakimzade Niyazi, author, composer, playwright, poet, and political activist
 Gʻafur Gʻulom, poet, writer, and literary translator; considered one of the most influential Uzbek writers of the 20th century
 Jahangir Mamatov, journalist, author, politician, political analyst, and linguist
 Ismat Xushev, journalist, author, and political analyst
 Abdulla Oripov, poet, politician, literary translator, and former head of the Writers' Union of Uzbekistan; one of the National Poets of Uzbekistan, winner of the prestigious Hero of Uzbekistan award
 Komil Yashin, playwright, Hero of Socialist Labour
 Erkin Vohidov, poet, playwright, and literary translator; one of the National Poets of Uzbekistan, winner of the prestigious Hero of Uzbekistan award
 Zulfiya, writer
 Abdulla Qahhor, novelist, short story writer, poet, playwright, and literary translator; considered one of the best Uzbek writers of the 20th century
 Odil Yakubov, writer

Politics and military 

 Qutb al-Din Aibak, founder of Dehli Sultanate
 Anushtegin Gharchai, turkic commander and fonder of Khwarazmian dynasty
 Alauddin Khalji, Turco-Afghan emperor of indian subcontinent 
 Islam Karimov, first President of Uzbekistan
 Shavkat Mirziyoyev, current President of Uzbekistan
 Abdul Rashid Dostum, former Afghan warlord of Uzbek ethnicity
 Abdulla Aripov, current Prime Minister
 Abdul Rauf Ibrahimi, Uzbek politician from Afghanistan
 Abdusamat Taymetov, first Uzbek pilot
 Azad Beg, Abdul Waris Karimi, was an Uzbek doctor serving in the Pakistan Army
 Babur, founder of Mughal Empire 
 Chagatai Khan, Khan of Chagatai Khanate
Muhammad Khudayar Khan, ruler of Kokand
Nasruddin Khan, last ruler of Khanate of Kokand, who was settled in Peshawar after Khanate was abolished
 Khan Jahan Ali, Khan-i-Azam of Khalifatabad
 Gul Mohammad Pahalwan, former Afghan warlord from an Uzbek ethnicity 
 Sayed Anwar Sadat, ethnic Uzbek politician in Afghanistan
 Suraya Dalil, Afghan physician and politician
 Husn Banu Ghazanfar, is a politician in Afghanistan, formerly served as the Minister of Women's Affairs
 Delbar Nazari, is an Afghanistan politician who serves as Minister for Women's Affairs
 Abdul Majid Rouzi, Uzbek commander of Arab Descent during the Afghan Civil war
 Mohammad Rozi, is an Uzbek fugitive wanted for shooting three Australian troops serving in southern Afghanistan and two Afghan National Army
 Ahmad Khan Samangani, was an Afghan member of parliament and a commander of the Junbish-i Milli
 Mohammad Hashim Zare, is the current governor of Samangan, Afghanistan
 Muhammad Shaybani, Uzbek emperor and warrior
 Muhammad Yunus Nawandish, was the Mayor of Kabul from after his appointment by Afghan President Hamid Karzai in January 2010
 Timur, Uzbek conqueror
 Sabuktigin, founder of the Ghaznavid dynasty 
 Mahmud of Ghazni, Afghan-Turkic ruler of Ghaznavid dynasty 
 Rasul Pahlawan, Uzbek military leader in Afghanistan and Brother of Abdul Malik Pahlawan

Science
Ulugh Beg (1394-1449), Timurid sultan, as well as an astronomer and mathematician
Yitzhak Apeloig (born 1944), Israeli computational chemistry professor, and President of the Technion
 Salizhan Sharipov, cosmonaut
 Vladimir Vapnik, co-inventor of Support Vector Machines and an IEEE John von Neumann Medal recipient

Sports

 Djamolidine Abdoujaparov, cyclist
 Bekzod Abdurakhmonov, wrestler
 Nodirbek Abdusattorov (born 2004), chess grandmaster and World Rapid Chess Champion (since 2021)
 Akgul Amanmuradova, tennis player
 Aleksandr Agafonov, swimmer
 Vladimir Broun, Israeli-Uzbek footballer
 Ruslan Chagaev, boxer
 Server Djeparov, footballer
 Anastasia Gimazetdinova, skater
 Denis Istomin, tennis player
 Vlada Katic, Israeli-Uzbek tennis player
 Michael Kolganov, Israeli-Uzbek world champion sprint kayaker
 Ariel Mastov, Israeli-Uzbek world champion kickboxer
 Ida Mayrin, Israeli-Uzbek rhythmic gymnast
 Ibrahim Nazarov, swimmer
 Artem Knyazev, skater
 Mirjalol Kasymov, footballer
 Ravshan Irmatov, football referee
 Donior Islamov (born 1989), wrestler
 Oksana Chusovitina, gymnast
 Rustam Kasimdzhanov, chess player
 Sakina Mamedova, sports shooter
 Makhmud Muradov, mixed martial artist, first Uzbek UFC fighter
 Anisa Petrova, fencer
 Alexander Shatilov, Israeli-Uzbek European champion gymnast
 Venera Zaripova, Israeli-Uzbek rhythmic gymnast

See also

 Uzbekistan
 Uzbeks
 Uzbeks in Afghanistan

Uzbeks